Robert Duthil (24 November 1899 – 19 December 1967) was a French pole vaulter. He competed at the 1924 Summer Olympics and finished 11th.

References

External links
 

1899 births
Date of death unknown
French male pole vaulters
Athletes (track and field) at the 1924 Summer Olympics
Olympic athletes of France
Sportspeople from Bordeaux